Piera Tizzoni (born 14 February 1940, in Turin) is a former Italian long jumper.

Biography
Piera Tizzoni participated at one edition of the Summer Olympics (1960), she has 5 caps in national team from 1958 to 1960.

Achievements

National titles
Piera Tizzoni has won the individual national championship eight times.
2 wins on long jump (1959, 1960)

See also
 Italian record progression women's long jump
 Italy national relay team

References

External links
 

1940 births
Living people
Italian female sprinters
Italian female long jumpers
Athletes (track and field) at the 1960 Summer Olympics
Sportspeople from Turin
Olympic athletes of Italy
20th-century Italian women